Lasiolopha saturata is a moth of the family Nolidae first described by Francis Walker in 1865. It is found in Oriental tropics of India, Sri Lanka, Thailand, New Guinea and Australia.

Description
Forewings dark grayish green with two irregular green bands. Hindwings gray brownish with orange shades at the margin. The caterpillar has a greenish body with a lateral white line. Head orange with black markings. Thorax bulbous.

Larval food plant is Memecylon. Pupation occurs in a cocoon at the base of mid-rib. The cocoon is semi-ovoid and the pupa is ovoid.

References

Moths of Asia
Moths described in 1865
Nolidae